Albert W. Ham (February 6, 1925 in Malden, Massachusetts — October 4, 2001 in Spring Hill, Florida) was an American composer and jingle writer. He was notable as the composer of the Move Closer to Your World music package used since the 1970s on WPVI-TV's Action News broadcasts in Philadelphia, and, most notably, WKBW-TV's Eyewitness News, as well as on many other newscasts in the United States throughout the 1970s and 1980s. He was also notable as creator of the adult standards radio format Music of Your Life.

Biography
Ham began as bass player for Artie Shaw when he was 17. While attending Amherst College after WWII, Ham arranged and played double bass for the Tony Pastor Orchestra when the featured singers were Rosemary Clooney and her sister Betty. When Tex Beneke re-formed the Glenn Miller Orchestra, Ham joined as arranger and bass player, working with Henry Mancini, then on staff as arranger. While working for Beneke he met and married Mary Mayo, who was singing with the Glenn Miller Orchestra.

After the birth of their daughter Lorri, Ham and his wife moved to New York in 1956 where he worked at Columbia Records. He was named director of special artists and repertoire (A&R) projects under Mitch Miller and produced records for such artists as The Ray Conniff Singers, The Ray Conniff Orchestra, Rosemary Clooney, Vic Damone, Percy Faith, Jerry Vale, Johnny Mathis, Johnnie Ray, Leslie Uggams, Kitty Callen, Guy Mitchell, The Kirby Stone Four, Tony Bennett, The Count Basie Orchestra, Frankie Laine, Jimmy Dean, The Four Lads, and Oscar Brown, Jr.  He was also recording director for original cast albums,  and produced LPs of such Broadway hits as West Side Story, Most Happy Fella, Gypsy, House of Flowers, and Bells are Ringing.

During his time as a producer at Columbia, Ham brought more to the studio than his knowledge of music and his natural intuition for recognizing hit material. He brought an electronic knowledge that resulted in many technical studio improvements and a "spatial" sound that he put to use when he helped to create the first stereo LPs issued by Columbia.  He worked with Dr. Peter Goldmark, creator of the Long - Playing record, on special circuit projects that broke new ground for stereo, multi-track recordings and broadcast signal processing.

In the commercial field Al worked consistently as a composer and arranger.  His commercials have won many awards for best musical theme and scoring, including CLIO Awards and four gold medal winners at the International Film and Television Festivals.  As arranger, composer, or both, Al’s many commercials include State Farm Insurance ("Like a good neighbor, State Farm is there."), Breck Shampoo, McDonald's (i.e. "You Deserve a Break Today"), Gillette, Kinney Shoes, Woolco, Kodak, and Scope.

Al also composed, arranged, and conducted news and station image music packages that have been broadcast by scores of TV stations across the country.  They include "Move Closer to Your World", "Part of Your Life", "Home Country", "Bringing it Home to You", and "On Top of It All".

Al’s film credits include the score of the Electronovision version of Harlow, which produced the song "I Believed it All", (Written with Lyricists Marilyn and Alan Bergman).  An Academy Award nomination for his superb adaptation and scoring of Warner Brothers’ Stop the World – I Want to Get Off, which he also conducted.  And, a Grammy award for the "Best Spoken Word Recording" for his production of James Whitmore’s Give 'em Hell, Harry! on United Artists Records.   Al also acted as programmer and associate producer for T.A.M.I. (Teenage Musical International) which featured performances by The Rolling Stones, The Beach Boys, James Brown, The Supremes, Marvin Gaye, Lesley Gore, Chuck Berry, and many other popular music stars.  The show was a front runner of the type of concert programming that is now standard TV fare.

Ham’s additional musical credits include his arrangement and production of "I’d Like to Teach the World to Sing" by his group, the Hillside Singers (which included his wife Mary and daughter Lorri) for Metromedia Records, and the recordings he produced with his group The Midas Touch on MCA records. He also received a Grammy nomination for "Best Spoken Word Recording" for "Senator Sam at Home".

In 1978, after years of research, Ham created the Music of Your Life radio format, which played on over 200 radio stations in the United States.

His television news music packages were syndicated through his company, Mayoham Music.

Ham passed away in October 2001 at the age of 76

News music packages written and composed by Al Ham
 Bringing It Home to You
 Home Country
 Move Closer to Your World
 On Top of It All
 Part of Your Life

References

External links

1925 births
2001 deaths
American male songwriters
American television composers
Record producers from Massachusetts
American jazz double-bassists
Male double-bassists
Columbia Records
20th-century American composers
20th-century double-bassists
20th-century American male musicians
American male jazz musicians